is an underground metro station located in Chikusa-ku, Nagoya, Aichi Prefecture, Japan operated by the Nagoya Municipal Subway. It is an interchange station and is located 11.7 rail kilometers from the terminus of the Higashiyama Line at Takabata Station and 6.3 rail kilometers from the terminus of the Sakura-dōri Line at Nakamura Kuyakusho Station.

History
Imaike Station was opened on 15 June 1960 as a station on the Higashiyama Line. The Sakura-dōri Line connected to the station on 10 September 1989. The wicket gates were automated to use the Manaca smart card system from 11 February 2011. Platform screen doors were installed on the Sakura-dōri Line platform on 30 April 2011.

Lines 
 
  (Station number: H14)
  (Station number: S08)

Layout
Imaike Station has two underground island platforms.

Platforms

References

External links

 Imaike Station official web site 

Chikusa-ku, Nagoya
Railway stations in Japan opened in 1960
Railway stations in Aichi Prefecture